Mohammad Qazvini (1876–1949) was a prominent figure in modern Iranian culture and literature.

Education and activities
Qazvini was born in Tehran.
Qazvini studied at literary and philosophical seminaries, studying culture, jurisprudence, principles, theology, ancient wisdom and gained knowledge of the various branches of Arabic literature.

His brother Mirza Ahmad Khan invited 28-year-old Qazvini to London. Orientalist Edward Granville Browne was familiar and interested in Qazvini's research and expertise and met him at the University of Cambridge. Qazvini remained in Europe for almost thirty five years.

References

Sources

Further reading
 

Iranian expatriate academics
1876 births
1949 deaths
People from Tehran